Florence is an unincorporated community and census-designated place (CDP) located within Florence Township, in Burlington County, New Jersey, United States, that was established as part of the 2010 United States Census. As of the 2000 United States Census, the CDP was combined as Florence-Roebling, which had a total population of 8,200. As of the 2010 Census, the Florence-Roebling CDP was split into its components, Roebling (with a population of 3,715) and Florence. As of the 2010 Census, the population of the Florence CDP was 4,426.

Geography
According to the United States Census Bureau, the CDP had a total area of 1.490 square miles (3.857 km2), including 1.263 square miles (3.270 km2) of land and 0.587 square miles (1.029 km2) of water (15.23%).

Demographics

2010 Census

Transportation
The River Line offers service to Camden and Trenton Rail Station, with stations in Roebling at Hornberger Avenue and Florence at U.S. Route 130.

New Jersey Transit provides service to and from Philadelphia on the 409.

References

Census-designated places in Burlington County, New Jersey
Florence Township, New Jersey